Kinnell is a surname. Notable people with the surname include:

 Andy Kinnell (born 1947), Scottish footballer
 Galway Kinnell (1927–2014), American poet
 George Kinnell (1937–2021), Scottish footballer
 Gordon Kinnell (born 1891), English Anglican priest
 Murray Kinnell (1889–1954), English actor

Places

Kinnell, Angus in Scotland